The 3rd constituency of Budapest is one of the single member constituencies of the National Assembly, the national legislature of Hungary. The constituency standard abbreviation: Budapest 03. OEVK.

Since 2022, it has been represented by Miklós Hajnal of the Momentum party.

Geography
The 3rd constituency is located in western part of Buda.

The constituency borders with 4th constituency to the north, 1st constituency to the east, 2nd constituency to the south and 2nd constituency of Pest County to the west.

List of districts
The constituency includes the following municipalities:

 District XII.: Full part of the district.
 District II.: Southern part (Víziváros, Országút and south of the Hűvösvölgyi út) of the district.

History
The 3rd constituency of Budapest was created in 2011 and contained of the pre-2011 abolished constituencies of the part of 1st, 2nd and 18th constituency of the capital. Its borders have not changed since its creation.

Members
The constituency was first represented by János Fónagy of the Fidesz from 2014 to 2018. In the 2018 election Gergely Gulyás of the Fidesz was elected representative. He was succeeded by Miklós Hajnal of the Momentum Movement in 2022 (with United for Hungary support).

Election result

2022 election

2018 election

2014 election

Notes

References

Budapest 3rd